Beaver Harbour may refer to one of the following places :
Beaver Harbour, New Brunswick, Canada
Beaver Harbour, a local service district in Pennfield Parish, New Brunswick, Canada
Beaver Harbour, Nova Scotia, Canada
Beaver Harbour (British Columbia), a bay on Vancouver Island, Canada

See also
Beaver Cove (disambiguation)
Beaver (disambiguation)